Red Harbour is a Canadian municipality of Newfoundland and Labrador. It is located 20 kilometres northeast of Marystown.

Settlement 
Red Harbour was inhabited from the early 19th century until the early 1960s when the half dozen families living there abandoned the community under the resettlement program. The present town was created when residents from Port Elizabeth (Flat Islands) convinced the provincial government to relocate them to Red Harbour during the resettlement program of the 1960s. Red Harbour is primarily a fishing community. Species fished are lobster, snowcrab, lumproe, and cod.  The town has modern harbour facilities constructed in 1997.

Town Council 
The town council consists of:

Mayor: Cory Miller
Councilors: Wallace Rowe, Fred Kenway and Jamie Grondin.

Janelle Slaney is the current Town Clerk. Kevin Paddle served as Town Clerk/Manager from 2003 to 2019.

The position was previously held by Trudy Bennett (1997–2003) and prior to Ms. Bennett by Walter Kenway who served as Town Clerk for many years. Mr. Kenway was also Mayor of Red Harbour for several years and was one of the community leaders responsible for creating the community in 1969.

Demographics 

See also
Burin Peninsula
List of cities and towns in Newfoundland and Labrador
Marystown

References

External links 
Municipal Affairs, Government of Newfoundland and Labrador
Harbour Authority of Red Harbour

Guild Of ICIA
Red Harbour - Encyclopedia of Newfoundland and Labrador, vol. 4, p. 540-541.

Populated coastal places in Canada
Towns in Newfoundland and Labrador